William Richardson House is a historic home located at Union Springs in Cayuga County, New York.  It was built about 1830 and is a remarkably intact late Federal / early Greek Revival–style farmhouse. It is a 2-story, three-bay brick dwelling main block with a -story side ell and -story rear wing.  Also on the property are four late-19th-century / early-20th-century barns.

It was listed on the National Register of Historic Places in 2005.

Village history states that William Richardson came from Chester County, PA in 1791 and married Elizabeth Thompson.  Her father is noted as Thomas Thompson from Juniata in Western Pennsylvania.  William died in Levanna, NY in 1823.

References

External links

Houses on the National Register of Historic Places in New York (state)
Greek Revival houses in New York (state)
Federal architecture in New York (state)
Houses completed in 1840
Houses in Cayuga County, New York
National Register of Historic Places in Cayuga County, New York